Varea may refer to:

Juan Manuel Varea (born 1986), Argentine footballer
Rupeni Varea (born 1968), Romanian weightlifter
CD Varea, Spanish football team
Varea, a locality in Logroño, La Rioja, Spain